The Amazing Woman is a 1920 American silent drama film directed by John G. Adolfi and starring Ed Coxen and Ruth Clifford. It was released by the Republic Distributing Company.

The film is extant and preserved by the Library of Congress.

Plot
As described in a film magazine, Anitra (Clifford), who has come to believe that Ralph (Coxen), the soldier she loves, will never return from abroad, yields to the plea of John (Robson), a man many years her senior, and goes to live with him in the city. In time he tires of her and dismisses her with a cash settlement. She resolves to aid the poorer children of the city from being despoiled by forcing the wealthy to pay for them. Like the Flame, she captivates a wealthy man-about-town and uses the money she obtains from him to found a hospital for the poor and a gambling house for the rich, using the proceeds from the latter to support the former. The return of her sweetheart from overseas influences her to a new course. After setting up an endowment to pay for the hospital, she works and manages to get her sweetheart elected mayor on a reform ticket, after which she closes her gambling house along with other evil institutions in the city. Then she discovers that Ralph's father is John, the man who brought about her ruin, and her happiness seems wrecked. However, it turns out that he is only Ralph's foster-father, and after his death, she finds happiness in marriage with Ralph.

Cast
Edward Coxen as Ralph Strong
Ruth Clifford as Anitra Frane
Andrew Robson as John Strong
Richard Morris as Gaston Duval
Mrs. Orlamonde as Anitra's mother

References

External links

1920 films
American silent feature films
Films directed by John G. Adolfi
1920 drama films
American black-and-white films
Silent American drama films
1920s American films